Jenny Hallstenson (born 29 October 1980) is a Swedish football midfielder who most recently played in the Swedish 1st Division for QBIK. She previously played in the Damallsvenskan with QBIK and Göteborg FC, also playing the Champions League with the latter.

She announced her pregnancy during the 2012 season.

References

1980 births
Living people
Swedish women's footballers
Damallsvenskan players
BK Häcken FF players
QBIK players
Women's association football midfielders